Jan Jacob Slauerhoff (15 September 1898 – 5 October 1936), who published as J. Slauerhoff, was a Dutch poet and novelist. He is considered one of the most important Dutch language writers.

Youth
Slauerhoff attended HBS (secondary school) in Leeuwarden, where he first met fellow future writer Simon Vestdijk, who was from Harlingen. In 1916, Slauerhoff and Vestdijk both moved to Amsterdam to read medicine. While at the university, Slauerhoff wrote his first poems; his debut as a poet was in the Communist magazine De Nieuwe Tijd. He edited the Amsterdam student magazine Propria Cures from 1919 to 1920. In 1919, Slauerhoff became engaged to a Dutch language student, Truus de Ruyter. In 1921 he joined the staff of the literary magazine Het Getij and later that of De Vrije Bladen; in this period he became acquainted with poets Hendrik Marsman and Hendrik de Vries.

Early career
His first collection of verse, Archipel ("Archipelago"), was published in 1923. Afterwards, he started working as a medical doctor on board of ships, especially in South East Asia. Much of his work refers to travel, to longing for far coasts, to China and Japan, and to the sea.

Marriage, final years

His fame as a writer, meanwhile, spread. In 1932 he published Het verboden rijk ("The Forbidden Kingdom"), a partly historical, partly magical realist novel combining the life of a 20th-century European with that of Luís de Camões, the 16th-century Portuguese poet (author of sonnets and the epic The Lusiads) who spent part of his life in the Orient. Despite not being translated into English until 2012, it attracted attention from scholars publishing in English. Jane Fenoulhet, for instance, referred to it as an important modernist novel in 2001. Both Het verboden rijk and the follow-up novel Het leven op aarde ("Life on Earth," 1934) were widely praised, and his 1933 verse collection Soleares was awarded the Van der Hoogt Prize.

Style and themes
Though Slauerhoff writes in the time of expressionism, his poetry is, according to Garmt Stuiveling and G.J. van Bork, essentially romantic: strongly autobiographical, it evidences restlessness, imagination, and a longing for faraway places, expressed through an identification with tramps, discoverers, and pirates.

Much of Slauerhoff's work is concerned with the poor and downtrodden; especially the poetry collections Archipel (1923), Eldorado (1928), Soleares (1933), and Een eerlijk zeemansgraf (1936). A performance of his play Jan Pietersz. Coen (1930), highly critical of Jan Pieterszoon Coen (seventeenth-century officer of the Dutch East India Company in Indonesia and two-term Governor-General of the Dutch East Indies), was prohibited by the mayor of Amsterdam in 1948.

Posthumous editions

Two works in progress that were nearly finished at the time of Slauerhoff's death, the original novel De opstand van Guadalajara ("The Guadalajara Uprising") and the translation of Martín Luis Guzmán's novel In de schaduw van den leider ("In the Shadow of the Leader"), were published posthumously in 1937.

A Committee for the Preparation of Slauerhoff's Complete Works was put together and convened to compile his Complete Works. This Committee, which consisted of leading literary figures, among which a number of friends of Slauerhoff, included D.A.M. Binnendijk, Menno ter Braak, N.A. Donkersloot, J. Greshoff, Kees Lekkerkerker, Hendrik Marsman, Adriaan Roland Holst, and Constant van Wessem. Du Perron contributed a general outline for the ordering and grouping of the contents, but declined to participate further. Work progressed slowly and was further slowed down by the events of World War II. The first volume appeared in 1941, one year behind schedule, and the series of eight volumes was not completed until 1958. Two of the Committee's members, Ter Braak and Marsman, died at the start of the war and the publisher, Nijgh & Van Ditmar, lost faith halfway through the project, which resulted in the intended separate volume of critical apparatus being scrapped and the last volume, containing Slauerhoff's essays, being published independently by Lekkerkerker.
Lekkerkerker, ever the dedicated text researcher and caretaker of Slauerhoff's literary heritage, continued over the years to unearth and study Slauerhoff's manuscripts and uncollected publications, resulting in ever better versions of the Complete Poems and Complete Prose volumes, culminating in the 1980s in the publication of editions of Slauerhoff's. In 2018 a complete version of all his poems was published (J. Slauerhoff - Verzamelde Gedichten. Nijgh & Van Ditmar, editors Hein Aalders and Menno Voskuil, 1037 pages). Wim Hazeu, one of the main biographers of the Netherlands, published a new version of the Slauerhoff biography (Arbeiderspers, 855 pages). The last two books were presented on 7 September 2018 in the Dorpskerk Huizum in Leeuwarden, because this city - birthplace of Slauerhoff - was in 2018 Cultural Capital of Europe. Slauerhoff's 1934 novel, Het leven op aarde, was republished by Handheld Press in a new English translation by David McKay as Adrift In The Middle Kingdom in 2019.

Slauerhoff and Huizum 

The small village Huizum in Friesland hosts the annual Slauerhoff Lecture. The church in Huizum holds a bronze bust of Slauerhoff's head, made by Ben van der Geest. Several family members of the poet, including his parents, are buried at the Huizum cemetery. The tombstone plate with the names of Slauerhoff's parents has been standing on a pedestal at the entrance of the Dorpskerk ever since the grave was cleared. The tombstone has been given this prominent place because one of Slauerhoff's longest poems (In Memoriam Patris, with 34 stanzas) is dedicated to the burial of his father at the same cemetery.

Bibliography

Translations (English) 
 J.J. Slauerhoff: Adrift In The Middle Kingdom. Transl. of Het leven op aarde, by David McKay, introd. by Arie Pos. Handheld Press, 2019. 
 Jan Jacob Slauerhoff: The Forbidden Kingdom. Transl. of Het verboden rijk, by Paul Vincent. London, Pushkin, 2012.

Poetry
Archipel ("Archipelago", 1923)
Clair-obscur (1927)
Oost-Azië ("East Asia", 1928, under ps. John Ravenswood)
Eldorado (1928)
Fleurs de Marécage ("Marsh Flowers", 1929, in French)
Saturnus ("Saturn", 1930, revised and enlarged re-issue of Clair-obscur)
Yoeng Poe Tsjoeng ("Of Little Use", translations from the Chinese and original poems, 1930)
Serenade (1930)
Soleares (1933)
Een eerlijk zeemansgraf ("An Honorable Sailor's Grave", 1936)
Verzamelde gedichten ("Collected Verse", 1947)
Al dwalend ("Wandering About", previously uncollected poems, 1947)
Alleen in mijn gedichten kan ik wonen ("Only in My Poems Can I Dwell", anthology, 1978)
Op aarde niet en niet op zee ("Not on earth, and not at sea"), poems selected by Henny Vrienten (Amsterdam: Nijgh & Van Ditmar 2000. )
In memoriam mijzelf ("In Memory of Myself", anthology, 2006)

Prose

Original prose
Het Lente-eiland en andere verhalen ("The Isle of Spring and Other Stories", 1930, short stories)
Schuim en asch ("Spume and Ashes", 1930, short stories)
Het verboden rijk (1932, novel); translated into English by Paul Vincent as The Forbidden Kingdom (London: Pushkin, 2012)
Het leven op aarde ("Life on Earth", 1934, novel)
De opstand van Guadalajara ("The Guadalajara Uprising", 1937, posthumously published novel)
Verzameld proza ("Collected Prose", 1961)
Verwonderd saam te zijn ("Strange Bedfellows", 1987, short stories and a one act play [1928–1935])
Alleen de havens zijn ons trouw ("Only the Ports Are Loyal to Us", 1992, travelogue short stories [1927–1932])

Translated prose
Ricardo Güiraldes — Don Segundo Sombra (1930, 1941², 1948³; from Spanish with R. Schreuder)
José Maria de Eça de Queiroz — De misdaad van Pater Amaro ("Father Amaro's Crime", 1932; from Portuguese with R. Schreuder)
Guillermo Hernández Mir — De hof der oranjeboomen ("The Court with the Orange Trees", 1932; from Spanish with R. Schreuder)
Paulo Setúbal — Johan Maurits van Nassau ("John Maurice of Nassau", 1933; from Portuguese by R. Schreuder with J. Slauerhoff)
Ramón Gómez de la Serna — Dokter hoe is het mogelijk ("Doctor Improbable", 1935; from Spanish)
Martín Luis Guzmán — In de schaduw van den leider ("In the Shadow of the Leader", 1937; from Spanish with G.J. Geers, published posthumously)
Jules Laforgue — Hamlet, of De gevolgen der kinderliefde ("Hamlet, or The Consequences of Filial Love", 1962, 1970²; from French [1928])
Thomas Raucat — Twee verhalen ("Two Short Stories", 1974; from French [1929])

Drama
Jan Pietersz. Coen (1931, tragedy)

Miscellaneous
Verzamelde werken ("Complete Works", 8 vols., 1941–1958)
Brieven van Slauerhoff ("Letters from Slauerhoff", ed. by Arthur Lehning, 1955)
Dagboek ("Diary", ed. by Kees Lekkerkerker, 1957)
Verzameld Proza ("Collected Prose"), 2 vols. (The Hague: Nijgh & Van Ditmar 1975.
Slauerhoff student auteur ("Slauerhoff Student Writer", prose and poetry from Slauerhoff's student days ed. by Eep Francken et al., 1983)
Brieven aan Hans Feriz ("Letters to Hans Feriz", ed. Herman Vernout, 1984)
Het China van Slauerhoff: aantekeningen en ontwerpen voor de Cameron-romans ("Slauerhoff's China – Notes and Outlines for the Cameron Novels", ed. W. Blok et al., 1985)
Hij droeg de zee en de verte aan zich mee ("He Carried the Sea and the Distance with Him", letters ed. by J.J. van Herpen, 1985)
Cristina Branco Canta Slauerhoff (Cristina Branco Sings Slauerhoff, 9 poems translated into Portuguese and put to Fado music, 2000)
Van een liefde die vriendschap bleef ("Of a Love that Remained Friendship", letters ed. by Wim Hazeu, 2007)
 Het heele leven is toch verloren ("Life Is a Lost Cause Anyway", poems, letters, diaries, ed. by Arie Pos et al.) 
Slauerhoff Biografie Wim Hazeu, 2018
J. Slauerhoff Verzamelde gedichten 2018, bezorgd door Hein Aalders en Menno Voskuil

There are a number of German, French, Italian, Ukrainian, and Portuguese translations of his prose works and Russian translations of his poetry.

References

External links

 Texts and secondary literature at DBNL

1898 births
1936 deaths
20th-century Dutch dramatists and playwrights
20th-century Dutch novelists
20th-century Dutch poets
Dutch male poets
Dutch medical writers
Dutch travel writers
Dutch male dramatists and playwrights
Dutch male novelists
People from Leeuwarden
Utrecht University
20th-century Dutch male writers